Baccaurea racemosa (common names: kapundung or menteng) is a species of fruit tree in Southeast Asia. It belongs to the family Phyllanthaceae.

The name of the elite suburb of Menteng in central Jakarta comes from this tree.

References

Flora of Indo-China
racemosa